Shumiatcher is the surname of a Russian Jewish family whose members achieved prominence in law, business, and the arts in Canada and the United States. Family members include:

Bella Shumiatcher (1911–1990), pianist and music educator
Esther Shumiatcher-Hirschbein (1899–1985), Yiddish poet and screenwriter
Jacqueline Shumiatcher (born 1923), Canadian philanthropist, arts patron, and art collector
Morris C. Shumiatcher (1917–2004), Canadian lawyer, human rights activist, philanthropist, arts patron, art collector, author, and lecturer
Minuetta Shumiatcher Kessler (1914–2002), Canadian-American concert pianist, classical music composer, and educator